The Ancona Open is a defunct men's tennis tournament that was played on the Grand Prix tennis circuit for one year in 1982. The event was held in Ancona, Italy and was played on indoor carpet courts.

Finals

Singles

Doubles

References
Ancona Open

ATP Tour
Grand Prix tennis circuit
Ancona
Ancona
Ancona